Ana Horra ( - I Am Free) is a studio album by the Lebanese singer Carole Samaha released in 2004.

The album includes the song "Habbet Delwa't" from the soundtrack of the movie Dreams of Our Lives (أحلام عمرنا).

Music videos 
Music videos for three songs from this album have been released:
 "Ghali alayi", directed by Caroline Labaki
 "Nezlet essitarah", directed by Salim el Turk
 "Habbet Delwa't", directed by Osman Abou Laban

Track listing 

The CD also includes the official video clip for the song "Ghali alayi".

References 

Carole Samaha albums
2004 albums